Stroller White Mountain, also known as Mount Stroller White, is a  mountain summit located in the Boundary Ranges, in the U.S. state of Alaska. Although modest in elevation, relief is significant since the mountain rises up from sea-level in less than seven miles.

E. J. "Stroller" White

The mountain's name was officially adopted in 1931 by the United States Geological Survey to honor Elmer John "Stroller" White (1859-1930), one of the most famous editors and publishers of the Territory of Alaska. He was living in Washington state when news broke of the gold strikes in the Klondike in 1898. He followed the rush north, where he worked for the Skagway News and wrote accounts about Soapy Smith's gang including the Shootout on Juneau Wharf. The powerful lure of the goldfields drew him to Dawson, Yukon, where he wrote a column called "The Stroller by E.J. White" which earned him the nickname "Stroller". From 1904 until 1916, Stroller White was editor of the Whitehorse Star. In 1917 he moved to the Juneau area where he published the Strollers Weekly. In 1918 he was appointed Chief of the Territorial Bureau of Publicity, and later served as Speaker of the Territorial House of Representatives.

Climate

Based on the Köppen climate classification, Stroller White Mountain is located in a subarctic climate zone with cold, wet winters, and cold summers. Weather systems coming off the Gulf of Alaska are forced upwards by the Coast Mountains (orographic lift), causing heavy precipitation in the form of rainfall and snowfall. Temperatures can drop below −10 °C with wind chill factors below −46 °C. This climate supports the Mendenhall Glacier and Juneau Icefield to the mountain's east. The months May through July offer the most favorable weather for viewing and climbing.

See also

List of mountain peaks of Alaska
Geography of Alaska

Gallery

References

External links
 Stroller White Mountain weather forecast
 Stroller White Mountain weather: NOAA Juneau, AK

Mountains of Alaska
Mountains of Juneau, Alaska
Boundary Ranges
North American 1000 m summits